SS18-like protein 1 is a protein that in humans is encoded by the SS18L1 gene.

Function 

Synovial sarcomas occur most frequently in the extremities around large joints. More than 90% of cases have a recurrent and specific chromosomal translocation, t(X;18)(p11.2;q11.2), in which the 5-prime end of the SS18 gene is fused in-frame to the 3-prime end of the SSX1, SSX2, or SSX4 gene. The SS18L1 gene is homologous to SS18.

Interactions 

SS18L1 has been shown to interact with CREB-binding protein. Biochemical pull down assays reveal SS18L1 to interact with several components of the human SWI/SNF chromatin remodeling complex.

References

Further reading